Council Bluff may refer to:

 Council Bluffs, Iowa
 Council Bluffs Municipal Airport
 Council Bluff, Nebraska, the site of Fort Atkinson
 Council Bluff Lake and Council Bluff Recreation Area in Missouri
 Council Bluff, a location in DeKalb County, Alabama
 A Choctaw council house near Agency, Mississippi

See also
 Council Bluffs & Nebraska Ferry Company